Eurrhyparodes tricoloralis is a moth of the family Crambidae.
It occurs in Africa, Seychelles, Chagos Archipelago, Réunion, Australia, India, Japan,  Hong Kong, Indonesia, New Guinea, Philippines, Sri Lanka and other countries of the far-east.

It has been displayed on a 30c stamp of the Cocos Keeling Islands in 1982.

References

External links
 Swedish Museum of Natural History - picture of typus

Spilomelinae
Moths described in 1859
Moths of Madagascar
Moths of Japan
Moths of Africa